The Kronenbourg Open was a one-off European Tour golf tournament which was played at Gardagolf Country Club in Soiano del Lago, Italy from 25–28 March 1993. Sam Torrance shot 69-68-73-74 for a 4 under par 72 hole score of 284, and defeated his fellow Scot Mike Miller by one stroke. The prize fund was £200,000, which was the smallest on the European Tour that season.

Winners

External links
Full results - the use of the euro sign appears to be an error. The British pound was the official currency of the European Tour at that time and the winnings shown only tie up with the total prize fund in the annual schedule if they are in pounds.

Former European Tour events
Golf tournaments in Italy